In the World of Animals  is a Soviet and Russian television program dedicated to zoology and wildlife research, especially the habits and habitat of animals.

It began airing in 1968.

In the early 1970s, the show started with a composition by Paul Mauriat Orchestra Colombe Ivre, with giraffe and rhino depicted in the main titles.

In 1974, the title sequence depicted a flying monkey, running under the ostriches, with the music of Ariel Ramirez's La peregrinación (Pilgrimage) from the Christmas cantata Our Christmas, also in adaptation by Paul Mauriat Orchestra. This screensaver lasted until 2009.

The program was the winner of the TEFI prize in 1996 for Best journalistic program.

List of hosts
1968—1975, Alexander Zguridi;
1975—1990, Vasily Peskov (1977 turns with Nikolay Drozdov);
1977—present, Nikolay Drozdov.

References

External links 
 Архив выпусков передачи на канале Россия-2

Channel One Russia original programming
Russia-1 original programming
Carousel (TV channel) original programming
Russian documentary television series
Soviet television shows
Russian television shows
1968 Soviet television series debuts
1960s Soviet television series
1970s Soviet television series
1980s Soviet television series
1990s Russian television series
2000s Russian television series
2010s Russian television series